Oncidium sarcodes is a Brazilian orchid.

References

External links 
 Illustration of Oncidium Sarcodes

Endemic orchids of Brazil
sarcodes